Transporter Industry International (abbreviated TII, also known as TII Group and KAMAG) is a worldwide operating conglomerate of companies providing heavy-duty transport vehicles and related services. Transporter Industry International is the global market leader and known for transports on behalf of NASA, for example.

History 

In 1988, Otto Rettenmaier acquired one of the oldest and internationally leading manufacturers of heavy-duty vehicles. The German company (Scheuerle Fahrzeugfabrik) was experiencing economic difficulties. Rettenmaier had already been active as an entrepreneur: He expanded his parents' mill business to become the world market leader in the production of wood fibers (cellulose).

After the successful restructuring of Scheuerle Fahrzeugfabrik, Rettenmaier bought the French competitor Nicolas Industrie in 1995, which also produced heavy-duty vehicles. To create the legal and organizational conditions for further growth, a holding company called Transporter Industry International was established. This was also intended to illustrate the global market position. The subsidiaries themselves retained their regional character and continued to operate independently, but cooperated in sales, for example.

In 2004, Rettenmaier was given the opportunity for further expansion. With the takeover and integration into the holding company, Rettenmaier completed the product range of Transporter Industry International.

Scheuerle, Nicolas, and Kamag developed joint products for high demanding projects. All three companies set world records in terms of the loads to be transported and in other areas. In 2015, Transporter Industry International acquired the civilian sector of the Indian trailer manufacturer Tratec, thus securing its first local presence outside Europe, with access to emerging markets in Asia; subsequently, the company was renamed.

Holding 
Transporter Industry International operates as a private limited company (Gesellschaft mit beschränkter Haftung) with its headquarters in Heilbronn, Baden-Württemberg, Germany. There are manufacturing facilities in Germany, France and India, service and sales offices in China and Moscow, a production sites in United States. It is fully owned by the Rettenmaier family holding. The management consists of Otto Rettenmaier, Susanne Rettenmaier, and Gerald Karch. In addition to the parent company (TII Group), there is a joint venture for sales and customer services (TII Sales) of all divisions, operating as a private limited partnership (Kommanditgesellschaft).

Divisions

Scheuerle 

Scheuerle Fahrzeugfabrik was founded in 1869 and is headquartered in Pfedelbach, Baden-Württemberg, Germany. The company invented the modern low-bed trailer concept in 1949. Numerous other innovations followed, for example in the field of hydraulic and electric four-way steering. In 1960, Scheuerle achieved international attention with the relocation of historic Abu Simbel temples in Egypt. Today, the portfolio includes self-propelled modular transporters, modular and compact vehicles for road transportation, as well as power boosters, for example. Besides, there are various services for maintenance and training.

Nicolas 
Nicolas Industrie is headquartered in Champs-sur-Yonne, Auxerre, France. The company was founded in 1855 and therefore has the longest history of all Transporter Industry International subsidiaries. Its first patent covers wheel motors and dates back to 1884. Nicolas developed the modern heavy-duty transporters with pendulum axles. Today, the company's product and service range are almost identical to Scheuerle.

Kamag 
Kamag Transporttechnik was founded in 1969 and is headquartered in Ulm, Baden-Württemberg, Germany. Its primary goal was to shift heavy transports to the road. Today, Kamag develops and produces specialized transporters and other modular vehicles for a wide range of applications.

NASA has been a customer of Kamag Transporttechnik since the year 1979. The company provides vehicles to move rockets, boosters, and satellite payloads. The Solid Rocket Motor (SRM) transporter, for example, moved the Space Shuttle segments between refurbishment and storage facilities on the Cape Canaveral Air Force Station and the Vehicle Assembly Building. Payload Canister Transporters (PCT) moved payload canisters between space shuttle payload processing facilities, the vertical processing facility, and the launch pad.

Tiiger 
Since 2015, Transporter Industry International builds and distributes heavy transportation equipment in Bawal, Haryana, India. The most important product of Tiiger (formerly TII India) is the Extender, a robust and maintenance-friendly telescopic semi-trailer, which is suitable for the transport of bulky loads such as bridge sections and wind turbine blades.

References

Further reading

External links 

 Official website of Transporter Industry International

Companies based in Heilbronn
Transport companies of Germany
Space Shuttle program